Rüdiger Overmans (born 6 April 1954 in Düsseldorf) is a German military historian who specializes in World War II history. His book German Military Losses in World War II, which he compiled as leader of a project sponsored by the Gerda Henkel Foundation, is one of the most comprehensive works about German casualties in World War II.

Biography 
Overmans joined the Bundeswehr in 1972, and studied economics at the Bundeswehr University Munich from 1974 to 1977. He completed his Ph.D. in 1982–1986 at the Bundeswehr University Hamburg, now known as Helmut Schmidt University. From 1987 to 2004 he was a research associate at the Military History Research Office (MGFA), first in Freiburg and later in Potsdam. In 1996 he received his doctorate in history with the seminal work German Military Losses in World War II at the University of Freiburg. From 1996 to 2001, Overmans lectured at the History Department of the University of Freiburg. Until his retirement in 2004, he had reached the military rank of lieutenant colonel. Since then he has worked as a freelance historian. He participated in a commission which issued an opinion to the number of victims in the Dresden bombing in February 1945.

Works
Main works by Overmans include:

Monographs

Chapters
  Jörg Echternkamp

Editorships

See also
 German casualties in World War II, largely based on Overmans's research

References

External links 
 
 
 Homepage of Rüdiger Overmans

German military historians
Historians of World War II
Living people
1954 births
Writers from Düsseldorf
Bundeswehr University Munich alumni
University of Freiburg alumni
Academic staff of the University of Freiburg
German male non-fiction writers